Blood of the Losers (also known as The Blood of the Victims) is a 2008 Italian war drama film directed by Michele Soavi. It is based on a book by Giampaolo Pansa.

Plot

Cast 
 Michele Placido as Franco Dogliani
 Barbora Bobuľová as Anna Spada / Costantina
 Alessandro Preziosi as Ettore Dogliani
 Philippe Leroy as Umberto Dogliani
 Giovanna Ralli as Giulia Dogliani
 Stefano Dionisi as Kurt
 Alina Nedelea as Lucia Dogliani
 Daniela Giordano as Maria Rossini
 Ana Caterina Morariu as Elisa
 Luigi Maria Burruano as Mario Vagagini
 Valerio Binasco as Nello Foresti 
 Tony Sperandeo as Salustri
 Raffaele Vannoli as Petrucci

Reception
In his review for Variety, Jay Weissberg heavily criticized the film, referring to it as "a dangerous example of historical manipulation disguised as relativism".

References

External links

2008 films
Italian war drama films
Films directed by Michele Soavi
2000s war drama films
2008 drama films
Films scored by Carlo Siliotto
Italian World War II films
2000s Italian films